The 2021 season was UiTM FC's second competitive season in the highest tier of Malaysian football after got promoted from 2019 Malaysia Premier League.

Players

Transfers

First leg
In:

Out:

Second leg
In:

Out:

Statistics

Appearances and goals
Players with no appearances not included in the list.

Competitions

Malaysia Super League

League table

Matches

References

UiTM
UiTM FC